Terroir is a 2008 South Korean television series starring Kim Joo-hyuk, Han Hye-jin, Yoo Sun, and Ki Tae-young. It aired on SBS, premiering on December 1, 2008 on Mondays and Tuesdays at 21:55 (KST) time slot.

Cast

Main cast
 Kim Joo-hyuk as Kang Tae-min
 Han Hye-jin as Lee Woo-joo
 Yoo Sun as Ahn Ji-sun
 Ki Tae-young as Joey Park

Supporting cast
 Park Byung-ho as Chairman Kang - Kang Tae-min's grandfather
 Jung Ho-bin as Kang Jung-tae - Kang Tae-min's uncle
 Jeon Soo-kyeong as Aunt Ok-rim
 Kim Byung-se as André Lim
 Chae Young-in as Manager Jo Min-ji
 Song Seung-hwan as Representative Yang Seung-geol
 Ryu Hyun-kyung as Gong Yook-gong
 Jang Hyo-jin as Shin Dae-ri
 Song Bong-eun as Sommelier
 Kim Jae-seung as Lee Jae-joo
 Cha Sung-hoon as Manager
 Lee Sung-min
 Lee Tae-sung as Park Dan-byul

External links

Seoul Broadcasting System television dramas
Korean-language television shows
2008 South Korean television series debuts
2009 South Korean television series endings